A Girl Spy in Mexico is a 1913 silent film short directed by and starring Romaine Fielding and costarring Mary Ryan. It was produced by the Lubin Manufacturing Company, Philadelphia, and distributed by the General Film Company.

Cast
Romaine Fielding - Colonel Ferro
Mary Ryan - Senorita Armaje- the Girl Spy
Robyn Adair - Lt. Blanco

References

External links
 A Girl Spy in Mexico at IMDb.com

1913 films
Films directed by Romaine Fielding
Lubin Manufacturing Company films
American black-and-white films
American silent short films
American thriller films
1910s thriller films
Silent thriller films
1910s American films